David Gwyther (born 6 December 1948) is a former Wales Under-23 international footballer.

Career
A tall, strong striker he began his career with Swansea Town and was their top scorer for four successive seasons scoring 60 goals in 216 matches. In 1971 Gwyther was selected for the Football Association of Wales tour of Tahiti, New Zealand, Australia and Malaysia but these matches were not classed as international cap matches.

He moved on to Halifax Town and Rotherham United.

In 1979, he joined Newport County and partnered John Aldridge and Tommy Tynan during the most successful period in the club's history. Gwyther played in the team that won promotion to Football League Third Division and the Welsh Cup and in the subsequent season reached the quarter-final of the European Cup Winners Cup.

He finished his career with Crewe Alexandra and Port Talbot Town.

References

Welsh footballers
Wales under-23 international footballers
English Football League players
Newport County A.F.C. players
Swansea City A.F.C. players
Halifax Town A.F.C. players
Rotherham United F.C. players
Gloucester City A.F.C. players
Crewe Alexandra F.C. players
Footballers from Swansea
1948 births
Living people
Port Talbot Town F.C. players
Association football forwards